The Lviv Chronicle is a Ruthenian chronicle from the early seventeenth century Halychyna.

This chronicle reflects the events in Kievan Rus from year 1498 to 1649, revealing valuable information about the political and economic conditions of the Ukrainian lands, as well as their relations with other polities, such as Poland, Moscow, and the Crimean Khanate. It describes such events as the Crimean Tatar raids, imposition of Catholicism in Western Ukraine by Uniate clergy and nobility, Ukrainian Cossack rebellion of 1630s, and the Khmelnytsky Uprising (1648—1654). It mentions a number of unique facts from Ukrainian history that are not available from any other source.

The text of the Lviv Chronicle was discovered in the beginning of 19th century by the Western Ukrainian Russophile historian Denis Zubrytsky. The manuscript of the Chronicle was kept at the Stauropegion Institute and is now stored in the Central Scientific Library of the National Academy of Sciences of Ukraine in Kyiv, Ukraine.

It was first published in Moscow in 1839 by the Russian historian Mikhail Pogodin and later published in Lviv in the 1870s. The Etterov copy of the Lviv Chronicle (GPB F.IV.144) is stored in the Russian State Library.

The Lviv Chronicle is very similar to the Sofia Second Chronicle and the latter is thought to have been based on the former.

References

Sources
  Гайдай Л. Історія України в особах, термінах, назвах і поняттях. — Луцьк: Вежа, 2000.
  Довідник з історії України. За ред. І. Підкови та Р. Шуста. — К.: Генеза, 1993.
  The original text of the Lviv Chronicle in modern Ukrainian orthography

East Slavic chronicles
17th-century history books
Ruthenians in the Polish–Lithuanian Commonwealth
15th century in Ukraine
16th century in Ukraine
17th century in Ukraine
Ukrainian language